Eduardo Felipe Escobedo Mateo (born 4 February 1984) is a Mexican professional boxer.

Professional career

WBO Super Bantamweight Championship
On December 8, 2007 Eduardo lost to Daniel Ponce de León, the bout was for Ponce's WBO Super Bantamweight title.

In June 2010, Escobedo beat the veteran Aristides Perez by T.K.O. to win the WBC Silver super featherweight title, the bout was held at the Estadio Centenario in Los Mochis, Sinaloa, Mexico.

References

External links

Boxers from Mexico City
Featherweight boxers
1984 births
Living people
Mexican male boxers
21st-century Mexican people